The Huguenot station is a Staten Island Railway station in the neighborhood of Huguenot, Staten Island, New York.

History 
The station opened on June 2, 1860, with the opening of the Staten Island Railway from Annadale to Tottenville. The station's original name was Bloomingview, named after the former town of Bloomingview, which is present day Huguenot. Afterwards the station was named "Huguenot Park," which was shortened to simply "Huguenot" by the Metropolitan Transportation Authority shortly after it took control of the railway from the Baltimore and Ohio Railroad in 1971 (the MTA also shortened the name of the "Old Town Road" station to simply "Old Town" at that time).

In 2019, the MTA announced that this station would become ADA-accessible as part of the agency's 2020–2024 Capital Program.

Station layout
The station is located on an open cut at Huguenot Avenue and has two side platforms. There is a steel and concrete canopy over the platforms at the stairs and an additional canopy is located about halfway down the northbound platform, features used as part of SIR station upgrades and platform extensions in the 1990s. Some morning rush hour local trains originate here; a pair of switches south of the station are used to reverse the direction of these trains. A spur used for ballast trains branches off the southbound track across Huguenot Avenue from the station entrance. This stop provides access to the nearby Tottenville High School.

Exit
There are exit stairs at the south end, and a brick stationhouse built in 1939 on street level. A pedestrian overpass formerly existed at the north end. The MTA runs a park & ride lot at the station.

References

External links

Staten Island Railway station list
Staten Island Railway general information
 Huguenot Avenue entrance from Google Maps Street View
 Platform level from Google Maps Street View

Staten Island Railway stations
Railway stations in the United States opened in 1860
1860 establishments in New York (state)